Neal Brooks Biggers Jr. (born July 1, 1935) is a senior United States district judge of the United States District Court for the Northern District of Mississippi.

Education and career

Born in Corinth, Mississippi, Biggers received a Bachelor of Arts degree from Millsaps College in 1956 and was in the United States Navy from 1956 to 1960, achieving the rank of Lieutenant. He received a Juris Doctor from the University of Mississippi School of Law in 1963. He was in private practice in Corinth from 1963 to 1968. He was a prosecuting attorney of Alcorn County, Mississippi in 1964, and was a district attorney of First Judicial District, Mississippi from 1968 to 1975. He was also an assistant instructor at the University of Mississippi in 1974. He was a circuit judge for the First Judicial District of Mississippi from 1975 to 1984, serving as a special commissioner for the Mississippi Supreme Court from 1980 to 1981.

Federal judicial service

On March 1, 1984, Biggers was nominated by President Ronald Reagan to a seat on the United States District Court for the Northern District of Mississippi vacated by Judge William Colbert Keady. Biggers was confirmed by the United States Senate on March 27, 1984, and received his commission on March 28, 1984. He served as Chief Judge from 1998 to 2000. He assumed senior status on October 1, 2000.

References

Sources
 

1935 births
Living people
Millsaps College alumni
University of Mississippi alumni
Judges of the United States District Court for the Northern District of Mississippi
United States district court judges appointed by Ronald Reagan
20th-century American judges
United States Navy officers
People from Corinth, Mississippi
21st-century American judges
District attorneys in Mississippi